Edward Fairbanks "Slim" Norris (July 19, 1907 – January 14, 1931) was an American Negro league third baseman in the 1930s.

A native of St. Charles, Kentucky, Norris played for the Louisville Black Caps in 1930. In 15 recorded games, he posted 15 hits in 58 plate appearances. Norris died in his hometown of St. Charles in 1931 at age 23.

References

External links
 and Baseball-Reference Black Baseball Stats and Seamheads

1907 births
1931 deaths
Louisville Black Caps players
Baseball third basemen
Baseball players from Kentucky
People from Hopkins County, Kentucky
20th-century African-American sportspeople